Bruce McCaw Howe Hendricks  (born 1957) is a United States district judge of the United States District Court for the District of South Carolina and former United States magistrate judge of the same court.

Biography

Hendricks was born Bruce McCaw Howe in 1957 in Charleston, South Carolina. Hendricks attended Sweet Briar College where she played basketball.  Later she transferred to the College of Charleston and received a Bachelor of Science degree in 1983. She received a Juris Doctor in 1990 from the University of South Carolina School of Law. From 1991 to 2002, she served as an Assistant United States Attorney in Charleston, South Carolina, where she prosecuted a wide array of criminal cases before both the United States District Court for the District of South Carolina and on appeal to the United States Court of Appeals for the Fourth Circuit. Since 2002, she has served as a United States magistrate judge, in Greenville from 2002 to 2010 and in Charleston since 2010. As part of her duties, she presided over the first drug court program in the District of South Carolina.

Federal judicial service

On June 26, 2013, President Barack Obama nominated Hendricks to serve as a United States District Judge of the United States District Court for the District of South Carolina, to the seat vacated by Judge Margaret B. Seymour, who assumed senior status on January 16, 2013. She received a hearing before the Senate Judiciary Committee on February 11, 2014. Her nomination was reported out of committee by a 16–2 vote on March 6, 2014. On May 22, 2014 Senate Majority Leader Harry Reid filed for cloture on the nomination. On Tuesday June 3, 2014 the United States Senate voted 59–35 to invoke cloture. On Wednesday, June 4, 2014 the United States Senate confirmed her by a 95–0 vote. She received her judicial commission on June 5, 2014.

References

External links

1957 births
Living people
Assistant United States Attorneys
College of Charleston alumni
Judges of the United States District Court for the District of South Carolina
Lawyers from Charleston, South Carolina
South Carolina lawyers
United States district court judges appointed by Barack Obama
United States magistrate judges
University of South Carolina School of Law alumni
21st-century American judges
21st-century American women judges